Commissioner v. First Security Bank of Utah, N.A., 405 U.S. 394 (1972), was a Supreme Court case holding that a bank prohibited from doing insurance business did not need to include in gross income the insurance commissions on credit life insurance that the bank referred to an unrelated insurance company.  The case syllabus says that "no share of premium received by life insurance company on business referred to it by commonly controlled national banks could be attributed to banks, and holding company did not utilize its control over banks and insurance company to distort their true net incomes, although banks encouraged lenders to take out insurance and referred them to insurance company, where federal banking laws would have prohibited banks from receiving share in premiums."

Dissent
Justice Thurgood Marshall's dissent criticizes the majority opinion's holding that merely because doing insurance would be illegal for a bank, the bank did not do insurance and thus had no insurance commission income.

References

External links

Insurance law
Legal history of Utah
United States Supreme Court cases
United States Supreme Court cases of the Burger Court
United States taxation and revenue case law
1972 in United States case law
1972 in Utah